The Mechanical Turk is an 18th-century fake chess-playing machine.

Mechanical Turk may also refer to:

 Amazon Mechanical Turk, an online crowdsourcing marketplace platform
 The Turk, a fictional chess computer that became John Henry in Terminator: The Sarah Connor Chronicles